Guilford is a village in Nodaway County, Missouri, United States, near the Platte River. The population was 85 at the 2010 census.

History
Guilford was founded about 1856. The community was named in commemoration of the Battle of Guilford Court House in the American Revolutionary War.  A post office called Guilford has been in operation since 1856.

Geography
The community is located at the intersection of Missouri routes M and AH approximately one half mile east of the Platte River and three miles north of the Nodaway-Andrew county line. The community of Barnard is 4.5 miles to the west on route M.

Demographics

2010 census
As of the census of 2010, there were 85 people, 36 households, and 23 families living in the village. The racial makeup of the village was 100.0% White.

There were 36 households, of which 25.0% had children under the age of 18 living with them, 41.7% were married couples living together, 8.3% had a female householder with no husband present, 13.9% had a male householder with no wife present, and 36.1% were non-families. 33.3% of all households were made up of individuals, and 8.4% had someone living alone who was 65 years of age or older. The average household size was 2.36 and the average family size was 3.00.

The median age in the village was 38.5 years. 17.6% of residents were under the age of 18; 10.7% were between the ages of 18 and 24; 28.2% were from 25 to 44; 36.5% were from 45 to 64; and 7.1% were 65 years of age or older. The gender makeup of the village was 52.9% male and 47.1% female.

2000 census
As of the census of 2000, there were 87 people, 34 households, and 21 families living in the town. The population density was 1,130.5 people per square mile (419.9/km2). There were 41 housing units at an average density of 532.8 per square mile (197.9/km2). The racial makeup of the town was 100.00% White. Hispanic or Latino of any race were 4.60% of the population.

There were 34 households, out of which 35.3% had children under the age of 18 living with them, 50.0% were married couples living together, 8.8% had a female householder with no husband present, and 35.3% were non-families. 32.4% of all households were made up of individuals, and 23.5% had someone living alone who was 65 years of age or older. The average household size was 2.56 and the average family size was 3.27.

In the town the population was spread out, with 26.4% under the age of 18, 12.6% from 18 to 24, 31.0% from 25 to 44, 11.5% from 45 to 64, and 18.4% who were 65 years of age or older. The median age was 37 years. For every 100 females, there were 102.3 males. For every 100 females age 18 and over, there were 88.2 males.

The median income for a household in the town was $20,625, and the median income for a family was $28,750. Males had a median income of $25,750 versus $19,500 for females. The per capita income for the town was $9,391. There were 25.0% of families and 28.6% of the population living below the poverty line, including 40.0% of under eighteens and 25.0% of those over 64.

Education
Until May, 2013 Guilford was served by the South Nodaway R-IV School District, and was home to the elementary school (grades Pre-K-6). The high school, grades 7-12, was in Barnard, five miles west of town. In May, 2013 all grades were moved to the Barnard school and the school in Guilford was closed.

Notable person
 Jerry Wallace - Country and popular music singer. His hits included "Primrose Lane", "Shutters And Boards", "In The Misty Moonlight", and If You Leave Me Tonight I'll Cry.

References

Villages in Nodaway County, Missouri
Villages in Missouri